Fritz Schweizer (date of birth unknown) was a footballer who played mainly as midfielder om the early 1900s.

Football career
Schweizer joined FC Basel's first team for their 1900–01 season. Schweizer played his domestic league debut for the club in the home game in the Landhof on 28 October 1900 as Basel played a 1–1 draw with Fire Flies Zürich. Schweizer became a regular starter he played in seven of the teams nine league games. But for the team this was a bad season, they ended the season in fifth position in the group stage. 

A curiosity in this season was the away game on 3 March 1901. This was an away game against Grasshopper Club and it ended in a 3–13 defeat. The reasons for this high defeat can be explained with the fact that one of the players missed the train and that the team played with a number of players from their reserve team. Nevertheless, to date this remains the teams’ highest and biggest defeat in the club’s history.

Schweizer stayed with the team one more season and played in six of the seven league matches. Compared to the previous season, Basel played better this league season and ended the group stage in second position in the table.

During his two seasons with the club, Schweizer played at least 24 games for Basel without scoring a goal.  13 of these games were in the Swiss Serie A and 11 were friendly games.

Notes

Footnotes

References

Sources
 Rotblau: Jahrbuch Saison 2017/2018. Publisher: FC Basel Marketing AG. 
 Die ersten 125 Jahre. Publisher: Josef Zindel im Friedrich Reinhardt Verlag, Basel. 
 Verein "Basler Fussballarchiv" Homepage
(NB: Despite all efforts, the editors of these books and the authors in "Basler Fussballarchiv" have failed to be able to identify all the players, their date and place of birth or date and place of death, who played in the games during the early years of FC Basel)

FC Basel players
Swiss men's footballers
Association football midfielders
Swiss Super League players
Date of birth missing
Date of death missing